Shanaj Ahmed (born 9 January 1993) is a Bangladeshi cricketer who plays for Sylhet Division. He made his Twenty20 debut on 11 June 2021, for Old DOHS Sports Club in the 2021 Dhaka Premier Division Twenty20 Cricket League.

See also
 List of Sylhet Division cricketers

References

External links
 

1993 births
Living people
Bangladeshi cricketers
Old DOHS Sports Club cricketers
Sylhet Division cricketers
People from Moulvibazar District